Valentine High School is a secondary school located in Valentine, Nebraska, United States.

It is the sole comprehensive high school in the Valentine Community Schools school district, which includes Valentine, Crookston, and Wood Lake.

About
Valentine High School is part of Valentine Community Schools, and takes in students from Valentine Elementary School and Valentine Middle School as well as two rural K-8 schools.

VHS offers drama and speech clubs, as well as a student council.  Students may take musical education classes, such as choir and band.

It was formerly a part of Valentine City Schools, which merged into Valentine Community Schools in 2006.

Athletics
The Badgers are members of the Southwest Conference.  The school offers competition in cross country, football, boys' and girls' golf, volleyball, boys' basketball, and wrestling.

References

Public high schools in Nebraska
Schools in Cherry County, Nebraska